26 Aurigae is a binary star system in the northern constellation of Auriga. It is visible to the naked eye as a faint star with an apparent visual magnitude of 5.41.

The distance to this system remains poorly constrained. A distance of  has been derived from fitting the spectrum.

26 Aurigae is a visual binary system, and the two stars orbit each other every 52.735 years with an ellipticity of 0.653 and an angular separation . The system is made of a magnitude 6.29 G-type red giant, and a hotter magnitude 6.21 star that has been classified as an early B-type main-sequence star to an A-type subgiant star.  Component A is the cool giant star, the brighter but less massive of the pair.  The hotter star is sometimes listed as the primary on the basis of its stronger showing in the blended spectrum.

References

B-type main-sequence stars
G-type giants
Binary stars
Auriga (constellation)
Durchmusterung objects
Aurigae, 26
037269
026536
1914
Suspected variables